Norman James may refer to:
Norman James (broadcaster), sports broadcaster
Norman James (footballer) (1908–1985), English footballer
Norman B. James (1872–1963), Alberta politician
Norman L. James (1840–1918), Wisconsin politician

See also